Flowers Apartments is a historic three-story building in Ogden, Utah. It was built in 1923 by the Taylor Building Company as an investment for George M. and Etha Flowers. It was listed on the National Register of Historic Places in 1987.

References

National Register of Historic Places in Weber County, Utah
Residential buildings completed in 1923
1923 establishments in Utah